Roslyn Harbor is a village in Nassau County, on the North Shore of Long Island, in New York, United States. It is considered part of the Greater Roslyn area, which is anchored by the Incorporated Village of Roslyn. The population was 1,051 at the 2010 census.

The Incorporated Village of Roslyn Harbor lies in both the Town of North Hempstead and the Town of Oyster Bay.

History 
Roslyn Harbor incorporated as a village on October 17, 1931 as a result of the residents wishing to make their own zoning codes and other laws under the Municipal Home Rule Law. At the time, the majority of Roslyn Harbor consisted of a few large estates.

The "Roslyn" part of Roslyn Harbor's name is shared with Roslyn, Roslyn Estates, and Roslyn Heights, and ultimately can be traced back to when the name "Roslyn" was chosen for that village, which was chosen because the geography in Roslyn reminded officials of the geography of Roslin, Scotland. The "Harbor" part of the name reflects its proximity to Hempstead Harbor. The name was chosen during the incorporation movement.

An earlier proposed name was Roslyn Hills, due to its hilly location, proximity to Roslyn, and because the Long Island Rail Road advertised the area as the "Switzerland of Long Island." The "Hills" was substituted with "Harbor" after concerns were expressed that it could be mixed up with Roslyn Heights.

Prior to incorporating, the area was generally considered part of Roslyn (which wouldn't incorporate until 1932), and before that name was chosen for the area in 1844, it was known as Hempstead Harbor.

Geography

Roslyn Harbor is located within the Hempstead Harbor Watershed, and is also located within the larger Long Island Sound/Atlantic Ocean Watershed.

Demographics

2010 census 
As of the census of 2010, there were 1,051 people residing in the village. The racial makeup of the village was 83.63% White, 1.43% African American, 11.80% Asian, 1.14% from other races, and 1.90% from two or more races. Hispanic or Latino of any race were 5.33% of the population.

Census 2000 
As of the census of 2000, there were 1,023 people, 356 households, and 301 families residing in the village. The population density was 858.9 people per square mile (331.9/km2). There were 367 housing units at an average density of 308.1 per square mile (119.1/km2). The racial makeup of the village was 91.59% White, 1.27% African American, 4.99% Asian, 1.08% from other races, and 1.08% from two or more races. Hispanic or Latino of any race were 3.32% of the population.

There were 356 households, out of which 34.6% had children under the age of 18 living with them, 77.2% were married couples living together, 5.3% had a female householder with no husband present, and 15.4% were non-families. 12.6% of all households were made up of individuals, and 6.2% had someone living alone who was 65 years of age or older. The average household size was 2.87 and the average family size was 3.12.

In the village, the population was spread out, with 23.5% under the age of 18, 4.3% from 18 to 24, 21.3% from 25 to 44, 31.5% from 45 to 64, and 19.5% who were 65 years of age or older. The median age was 46 years. For every 100 females, there were 95.6 males. For every 100 females age 18 and over, there were 90.0 males.

The median income for a household in the village was $128,295, and the median income for a family was $150,000. Males had a median income of $100,000 versus $41,071 for females. The per capita income for the village was $69,778. About 1.3% of families and 2.5% of the population were below the poverty line, including 3.3% of those under age 18 and 2.3% of those age 65 or over.

Government

Village government 
As of July 2021, the Mayor of Roslyn Harbor is Sandy K. Quentzel, the Deputy Mayor is Joshua Kopelowitz, and the Trustees are James Friscia, Jasun Fiorentino, and Abby Kurlender.

Representation in higher government

North Hempstead Town Board 
The parts of Roslyn Harbor in the Town of North Hempstead are located in its 2nd council district, and as of July 2021 is represented on the North Hempstead Town Council by Councilman Peter J. Zuckerman (D–East Hills).

Nassau County representation 
Roslyn Harbor is located in Nassau County's 11th Legislative district, which as of July 2021 is represented in the Nassau County Legislature by Delia DiRiggi-Whitton (D–Glen Cove).

New York State representation

New York State Assembly 
Roslyn Harbor is split between the New York State Assembly's 13th and 19th Assembly districts, which as of July 2021 are represented by Charles Lavine (D–Glen Cove) and Edward Ra (R–Garden City South), respectively.

New York State Senate 
Roslyn Harbor is located in the New York State Senate's 5th and 7th State Senate districts, which as of July 2021 are represented in the New York State Senate by James Gaughran (D–Northport) and Anna Kaplan (D–North Hills), respectively. The 5th and 7th districts serve the Oyster Bay and North Hempstead parts of the village, respectively.

Federal representation

United States Congress 
Roslyn Harbor is located in New York's 3rd congressional District, which as of July 2021 is represented in the United States Congress by Tom Suozzi (D–Glen Cove).

United States Senate 
Like the rest of New York, Roslyn Harbor is represented in the United States Senate by Charles Schumer (D) and Kirsten Gillibrand (D).

Politics 
In the 2016 U.S. presidential election, the majority of Roslyn Harbor voters voted for Hillary Clinton (D).

Education

School districts 
Roslyn Harbor is served by both the Roslyn Union Free School District and the North Shore Central School District. Students who reside in Roslyn Harbor and attend public schools go to one of these districts depending on where they live in the village.

Library districts 
Roslyn Harbor is served by Roslyn's library district and by the Gold Coast Library District. The boundaries of the library districts correspond with the school district boundaries; Roslyn's library district (the Bryant Library) serves the part of Roslyn Harbor in the Roslyn Union Free School District and the Gold Coast Library District serves the part of Roslyn Harbor in the North Shore Central School District.

Parks and recreation 

 Cedarmere – Former estate of William Cullen Bryant; now a park and preserve.
Engineers Country Club – A private country club in Roslyn Harbor.
 Nassau County Museum of Art – A major art museum in Roslyn Harbor.

Infrastructure

Transportation

Road 
Northern Boulevard (NY 25A) forms much of the village's southern border.

Other major roads within Roslyn Harbor include Back Road, Bryant Avenue, Glen Cove Avenue, Glen Cove Road, and Glenwood Road.

Rail 

The Greenvale station on the Long Island Rail Road's Oyster Bay Branch, despite its name, is located primarily in Roslyn Harbor, adjacent to the Roslyn Harbor–Greenvale border.

Bus 
Roslyn Harbor is served by the n20H, n21, and n27 bus routes, which are operated by Nassau Inter-County Express (NICE).

Utilities

Natural gas 
National Grid USA provides natural gas to homes and businesses that are hooked up to natural gas lines in Roslyn Harbor.

Power 
PSEG Long Island provides power to all homes and businesses within Roslyn Harbor.

Sewage 
Roslyn Harbor is not connected to any sanitary sewers, and as such, the entire village relies on cesspools and septic systems.

Water 
Roslyn Harbor is primarily located within the boundaries of (and is thus served by) the Roslyn Water District. Smaller areas of the village are located within the boundaries of (and are thus served by) the Glenwood and Jericho Water Districts.

Notable people
William Cullen Bryant – Poet and journalist. Bryant lived at Cedarmere.
Childs Frick – Paleontologist.
Brian Koppelman – Filmmaker, essayist, podcaster, TV series creator, former music business executive, and record producer.
Gabriela Mistral – Chilean poet and Nobel laureate.
Eugene H. Nickerson – Former democratic Nassau County Executive (1962–1970) and federal district court judge.

References

External links

 Roslyn Harbor official website

Roslyn Harbor, New York
Town of North Hempstead, New York
Oyster Bay (town), New York
Villages in New York (state)
Villages in Nassau County, New York
Populated coastal places in New York (state)